Waterfront dispute may refer to:
 1951 New Zealand waterfront dispute
 1998 Australian waterfront dispute
 2012 Auckland waterfront dispute